Henning Rehbaum (born 10 September 1973) is a German politician of the Christian Democratic Union (CDU) who has been serving as a member of the Bundestag since 2021.

Political career
Rehbaum was a member of the State Parliament of North Rhine-Westphalia from 2012 to 2021.

In the 2021 elections, Rehbaum was elected directly to the Bundestag, representing the Warendorf district. He has since been serving on the Committee on Transport.

Other activities
 Federal Network Agency for Electricity, Gas, Telecommunications, Posts and Railway (BNetzA), Alternate Member of the Rail Infrastructure Advisory Council (since 2022)

References 

Living people
1973 births
Christian Democratic Union of Germany politicians
Members of the Bundestag 2021–2025
21st-century German politicians
Members of the Landtag of North Rhine-Westphalia